Jailton Nunes de Oliveira (born January 30, 1974) is a former Brazilian football player.

Club statistics

References

External links

1974 births
Living people
Brazilian footballers
J1 League players
Shonan Bellmare players
Brazilian expatriate footballers
Expatriate footballers in Japan
Association football midfielders